Singles Collection +6 is the first greatest hits album by Japanese pop-rock band Wands. It was released on 16 March 1996 under B-Gram Records label. Album includes all singles released so far, two pick-ups from their studio albums and one new song exclusively for this album. The album reached #1 in its first week and sold 221,000 copies. The album charted for 14 weeks and sold more than 831,000 copies. This is the last album where former members with vocalist Show Uesugi released album. Next albums will be released with completely new members of band.

Track listing

References

1996 compilation albums
Wands (band) albums
Being Inc. compilation albums
Japanese-language compilation albums